Magi Matambakta (English: On Her Lap) is a 2018 Indian Meitei language film directed by Makhonmani Mongsaba and produced by Sunita Kapoor. The movie was selected for Bengaluru International Film Festival 2018; Third Eye Asian Film Festival, Mumbai, 2020 and Delhi International Film Festival 2020. The film won the Best Manipuri Film at the 2nd Jharkhand International Film Festival Awards (JIFFA) 2019.

Synopsis
The movie is a story of two boys raised very differently. Eventually, they faced the results of their upbringing. The movie shows the ill-effects of helicopter parenting.

Cast
 Lamjingba as Thangjam Sanathoi
 Aryan as Thangjam Henthoi
 Khaidem Anita as Ibemhal, Sanathoi's mother
 Philem Puneshori as Nungshitombi, Henthoi's mother
 Idhou as Thangjam Lukhoi, Henthoi's father
 Laishram Prakash as School Headmaster
 Takhellambam Lokendra as Salam Thoiba

Accolades
Idhou (Chakpram Rameshchandra) won the Best Actor in a Supporting Role - Male and Special Jury Mention Awards at the 9th SSS MANIFA 2019. Magi Matambakta won the Best Children Film Award at the 12th Manipur State Film Awards 2019. The citation for the award reads, "The film succeeds in highlighting the physical and mental space required for children to flourish in this highly competitive world."

References

2010s Meitei-language films
2018 films
Cinema of Manipur